Matthew B. Diedrichsen was an American soccer half back who earned one cap with the  U.S. national team in 1916.

When the United States Football Association selected the first national team for a 1916 tour of Scandinavia, Diedrichsen was the only player on the team who did not play on the East Coast.  Diedrichsen earned one cap with the national team during the tour when he played in the September 3, 1916 tie with Norway.

At the time, Diedrichsen played for Innisfails in the St. Louis Soccer League.

References

External links

American soccer players
United States men's international soccer players
St. Louis Soccer League players
Innisfails players
Year of birth missing
Year of death missing
Association football midfielders